Daphne Margaret Sybil Désirée Park, Baroness Park of Monmouth, CMG, OBE, FRSA (1 September 1921 – 24 March 2010) was a British intelligence officer, diplomat and public servant. During her career as a clandestine senior controller in MI6 (1943–1993) she was stationed in Austria (1946-1948), Moscow (1954–1956), the Congo (1959–1961), Zambia (1964–1967) and Hanoi (1969–1971).

Early life and education
Daphne Park was born to John Alexander and Doreen Gwynneth Park. Her father had contracted tuberculosis as a young man and was sent to Africa for rest and recuperation. He moved from South Africa to Nyasaland (now Malawi), and served as an intelligence officer during World War II. Thereafter he owned a tobacco plantation  and as an alluvial gold prospector in Tanganyika (now Tanzania). When Daphne was six months old she travelled to Africa with her mother to join him there. Park had a brother, David, who died aged 14.

When Park was 11, she returned to England and was educated at Rosa Bassett School in Streatham and at Somerville College, Oxford, where she graduated with a B.A. in modern languages in 1943. She was further educated at Newnham College, Cambridge, where she received a Certificate of Competent Knowledge in Russian in 1952.

Career
On graduating in 1943, Park turned down jobs in the Treasury and the Foreign Office to make a direct contribution to the war effort. She then joined the First Aid Nursing Yeomanry (FANY). During the selection process for FANY, she came to the attention of the Special Operations Executive (SOE), due to her understanding of ciphers. Park was promoted to the rank of sergeant and trained groups of operatives for Operation Jedburgh, whose task was to support the Resistance in Europe. In 1945 Park went to work as a briefing and dispatching officer in North Africa. On her return in 1946 she was sent to Vienna to establish an office for the Field Intelligence Agency Technical (FIAT), a unit of the Allied Commission responsible for tracking down former Axis scientists.

In 1948, she was attached to the Foreign Office, while actually working for the Secret Intelligence Service (SIS, aka MI6), becoming Third Secretary of the United Kingdom's delegation to NATO in 1952. She then became Second Secretary of the British Embassy in Moscow between 1954 and 1956.

From 1959 to 1961 she was Consul and First Secretary to Léopoldville, which in practice meant being head of MI6 there. British parliamentarian David Lea wrote that shortly before she died, she claimed to have been involved organising the abduction and murder of Patrice Lumumba during the Congo Crisis. Park (allegedly) confided to Lea that the reasoning behind the assassination was MI6 fears that Lumumba would hand over the high-value Katangese uranium deposits of Shinkolobwe as well as the diamonds and other important minerals largely located in the secessionist eastern state of Katanga to the Russians. The Shinkolobwe uranium mine provided the uranium used by the Manhattan Project, including in atomic bombs dropped on the Japanese cities of Hiroshima and Nagasaki in 1945.

She rose further through the ranks of the Foreign Office to serve in the British High Commission in Lusaka from 1964 to 1967 and then Consul-General to Hanoi from 1969 to 1970. In 1972 she was Chargé d'Affaires of the British Embassy of Ulan Bator for several months. From 1973 onwards she served in the Foreign Office then retired two years early in 1979 to become Principal of Somerville College, Oxford.

Despite her known intelligence service, SIS would neither confirm nor deny she was under their employment.

Affiliations
 1971–72, Honourable Research Fellow at the University of Kent
 1980–89, Principal of Somerville College
 1982–87, Governor of the British Broadcasting Corporation (BBC)
 1983–89, Member, British Library Board
 1984–90, chairman, Lord Chancellor's Advisory Committee on Legal Aid
 1985–89, Pro-Vice-Chancellor, University of Oxford
 1989–90, director, Zoo Development Trust
 1989–94, chairman, Royal Commission on the Historical Monuments of England
 1991–92, Trustee, Royal Armouries Development Trust
 1994–96, Member, Forum UK
 1994–2010, President, Society for the Promotion of the Training of Women
 2003, Patron, Action Congo
 Member, Royal Asiatic Society
 Governor, Ditchley Foundation
 Trustee/Patron, Great Britain-Sasakawa Foundation
 Trustee, Jardine Educational Trust
 Trustee, Lucy Faithfull Travel Scholarship Fund

Honours and awards
In 1960, Park was invested as an Officer of the Order of the British Empire (OBE) for her service as Consul to Leopoldville. In 1971 she was invested as a Companion of the Order of St Michael and St George (CMG) for her service as Consul-General to Hanoi. On 27 February 1990, she was created a life peer Baroness Park of Monmouth, of Broadway in the County of Hereford and Worcester, and served as SIS's semi-official spokesperson in the House of Lords. According to Lord Rooker, Park told him that her choice of 'Monmouth' in her title was unconnected with the market town of Monmouth but chosen to honour Monmouth House, a building in which her friends in the Secret Intelligence Service worked. She was an Honorary Fellow of Somerville College, and a Fellow of Chatham House (RIIA) and of the Royal Society of Arts (FRSA).

Personal life
Park was unmarried and had no children. She died after a long illness on 24 March 2010, aged 88. A Service of Thanksgiving for the Life and Work of Baroness Park was held on Tuesday 26 October 2010 and the eulogy was given by fellow ex-spy Sir Mark Allen, CMG.

References

Further reading

 Paddy Hayes: Queen of spies, The autobiography of Daphne Park. Duckworth Publishers, 2015.
 Susan Williams: Spies in the Congo: The Race for the Ore that Built the Atomic Bomb. Hurst, June 2016, 

1921 births
2010 deaths
Burials in Oxfordshire
Academics of the University of Kent
Alumni of Newnham College, Cambridge
Alumni of Somerville College, Oxford
BBC Governors
Members of HM Diplomatic Service
Companions of the Order of St Michael and St George
Conservative Party (UK) life peers
Fellows of the Royal Asiatic Society
Life peeresses created by Elizabeth II
Secret Intelligence Service personnel
Officers of the Order of the British Empire
People from Streatham
Place of death missing
Principals of Somerville College, Oxford
British women in World War II
British expatriates in the Soviet Union
British women diplomats
Fellows of Somerville College, Oxford
20th-century British diplomats